Pacific Bible College can refer to

Pacific Baptist Bible College, Long Beach, California
Pacific Bible College (Medford, Oregon), Medford, Oregon, United States
Pacific Bible College (Papua New Guinea), Pabrabuk, Nebilyer, Western Highlands, Papua New Guinea
Pacific Islands Bible College, Guam
Pacific Life Bible College, Surrey, British Columbia, Canada, formerly known as Pacific Bible College
Point Loma Nazarene University, formerly known as Pacific Bible College
Warner Pacific College, formerly known as Pacific Bible College
Wellington Pacific Bible College, Wellington, New Zealand